The Uele, also known by the phonetically identical Uélé, Ouélé, or Welle River, is a river in the Democratic Republic of the Congo.

Course
The Uele forms at Dungu, at the confluence of the Dungu and Kibali rivers, which both originate in the mountains near Lake Albert. Main tributaries to the Uele river are the Bomokandi River (left side) and Uere River (right side).

The Uele–Mbomou confluence at Yakoma marks the origin of the Ubangi River, which in turn flows into the Congo River. The Uele is the longest tributary of the Ubangi.

From satellite images, parts of the river look red from the iron oxide contaminants in the river.

Gallery

References

External links

 
Rivers of the Democratic Republic of the Congo
Ecoregions of the Democratic Republic of the Congo
Tributaries of the Ubangi River